Deyan Bonev (born July 2, 1967) is a Bulgarian sprint canoer who competed in the late 1980s. He won a bronze medal in the C-4 1000 m event at the 1989 ICF Canoe Sprint World Championships in Plovdiv.

At the 1988 Summer Olympics in Seoul, Boneve finished fourth in the C-2 500 m and ninth in the C-2 1000 m events.

References

Sports-reference.com profile

1967 births
Bulgarian male canoeists
Canoeists at the 1988 Summer Olympics
Living people
Olympic canoeists of Bulgaria
ICF Canoe Sprint World Championships medalists in Canadian